This is a list of Ministers of Finance of Russia.

Dates before 15 February 1918 are given in the Old Style.

Russian Empire

Provisional Government

Russian SFSR

People's Commissars of Finance

Ministers of Finance

Minister of Economy and Finance

Russian Federation

Minister of Economy and Finance

Ministers of Finance

See also
 Finance Minister
 Russian Council of Ministers
 Russian Provisional Government

External links
  Ministers of Imperial Russia

 
Finance